The orange-dotted tuskfish (Choerodon anchorago) is a species of wrasse native to the Indian Ocean from Sri Lanka eastward to French Polynesia in the western Pacific. Its range extends north to the Ryukyus and south to New Caledonia. It is commercially important, and can be found in the aquarium trade.

Along with blackspot tuskfish and a few other wrasse species, orange-dotted tuskfish have been observed taking small bivalves into the mouth and smashing them against a rock, a form of tool use by animals.

References

External links
 

Fish of Thailand
Orange-dotted tuskfish
Fish described in 1791